The Propaganda Poster Art Centre ( or ) is a museum located in Shanghai which exhibits posters from the Maoist period of communist China, especially from the Cultural Revolution period. The museum was located in the basement of an apartment building in Huashan Road facing Wukang Road, in the former French Concession area until 2019 when it relocated to an office building on Yan'an West Road.  It has a rich collection of rare last-piece posters.

The owner of the museum, Mr. Yang Pei Ming, is keeping the posters as they are to be seen as an art form. He started collecting the posters as a hobby in 1995, and he wants to preserve the posters for the future. The museum is visited mainly by tourists, as it is listed in guides such as Lonely Planet and Frommers.

References

External links

 Official website

Museums in Shanghai
Propaganda in China
Art museums and galleries in China
Poster museums